Epioblasma turgidula, the turgid blossom pearly mussel, turgid riffle shell, turgid-blossom naiad or turgid blossom, was a species of freshwater mussel, a mollusk in the family Unionidae. It is now extinct.

This species was native to the United States, where it was found in the drainage of the Cumberland River, Tennessee River, and several rivers in the Ozark Mountains. Its natural habitat was riffles and shoals of large rivers, which have now largely been destroyed by dams construction and dredging.

Like most other mussels in the sensitive genus Epioblasma, this species experienced severe declines during industrialization due to pollution, siltation, habitat destruction. The last known population was recorded in 1965 from the Duck River in Tennessee, near the town of Normandy. This population was killed by the construction of Normandy Dam in the following years.

References

Extinct bivalves
Bivalves described in 1858
ESA endangered species
Taxonomy articles created by Polbot
turgidula